Believer is a 2018 American documentary that examines the intersection between LGBT people and the Church of Jesus Christ of Latter-day Saints (LDS Church) through the eyes of Dan Reynolds, lead singer of pop rock band Imagine Dragons. It focuses on his efforts to organize the LOVELOUD Festival in Orem, Utah in support of Utah LGBTQ youth.

Filming took place in Salt Lake City and Orem, as well as New York City and Las Vegas, where Reynolds was born in 1987. The film's music was composed by Hans Zimmer. Also, Reynolds wrote two songs for the film. In January 2018, it was announced that HBO Documentary Films secured US distribution rights to the film.

The LDS Church released a statement just 10 days before the 2017 LOVELOUD event, supporting the effort "to foster a community of inclusion in which no one is mistreated because of who they are or what they believe."

Cast

 Dan Reynolds
 Aja Volkman
 Ben McKee
 Daniel Platzman
 Wayne Sermon
 Tyler Glenn
 Savannah Skyler

Awards
Believer won the GLAAD Media Award for Outstanding Documentary at the 30th GLAAD Media Awards. It was nominated for an Emmy Award for Outstanding Arts and Culture Documentary at the 40th News and Documentary Emmy Awards.

See also
 Homosexuality and The Church of Jesus Christ of Latter-day Saints
 LGBT Mormon suicides

References

External links 
 Believer Film on HBO
 LOVELOUD
 

2018 documentary films
2018 LGBT-related films
2018 films
2018 in Christianity
2018 in LGBT history
American LGBT-related films
Documentary films about LGBT and Christianity
Documentary films critical of Mormonism
Works about LGBT and Mormonism
Imagine Dragons
Documentary films about Utah
HBO documentary films
Films shot in Salt Lake City
Films shot in New York City
Films shot in the Las Vegas Valley
Films scored by Hans Zimmer
Rockumentaries
2010s English-language films
2010s American films